Robert L. Smith (born 1965) is a record producer and recording engineer in New York City. His work includes producing, recording and mixing numerous Billboard top 100 charting songs including 'Teenage Dream' and 'Hey, Soul Sister' with The Warblers for hit television show Glee. Robert has worked on recording projects with Lady Gaga for the single 'Speechless' which topped the Billboard Hot Singles Sales Chart in 2010 as well as tracks by Aerosmith, David Bowie, U2 and Stacie Rose.

Robert's Emmy Award nomination was earned for the documentary 'Full Battle Rattle' with composer Paul Brill, for which Robert was Producer, Sound Recordist and Sound Mixer.

Robert is a founding member of New York's Pyramid Recording Collective, and has his own music production company called Defy Recordings.

References

External links
  Awards Round Up
  Burma Soldier with U2
  Founder of Defy Recordings
 

Living people
American audio engineers
1965 births